Glossary of North American horse racing:

Additional glossaries at:
Glossary of Australian and New Zealand punting
Glossary of equestrian terms
Parimutuel betting#Parimutuel bet types

A

B

C

D

E

F

G

H

I

J

L

M

N

O

P

Q

R

S

T

U

W

References

Bibliography

External links
Frankie Lovato's 365 Days of Racing Term Videos

Horse racing in the United States
Horse racing in Canada
Gambling terminology
Horse Racing United S
Sociolinguistics lists
Sports terminology
Horse racing-related lists
United States sport-related lists
Canada sport-related lists
Wikipedia glossaries using description lists